By the Horns  is the second studio album by Australian singer-songwriter, Julia Stone. It was released in May 2012 and peaked at number 11 on the ARIA Charts. In an interview with Beat Magazine Stone affirmed the catalyst for the songs was her break-up with her long-term partner and drummer Mitch Connelly and her attempts to come to terms with the feelings that followed.

Reception

James Christopher Monger from AllMusic said "Stone's fragile voice is an acquired taste that falls somewhere between the primal affectations of Björk, the airy, pixie croon of Julee Cruise, and the throaty desperation of Stevie Nicks, but there's a soulfulness to it that lends a bit of phantom power to driving stand-out cuts like 'It's All Okay', 'With the Light' and 'Justine'.".

Clash Magazine said "With tales of broken hearts and bitter afterthoughts, the album is heavily loaded, yet the delivery is one of sensitivity and vulnerability." adding "A minimalistic musical backdrop, predominantly keyboards, allows Stone's vocal expanse to breathe and flourish. This is a clear transition from her work with brother Angus, allowing her individual expression, resulting in a work of true depth and emotion."

Sahib Hamid from the AU review called it "an introspective record which would bode well in this cold winter, sitting drinking a cup of warm tea while watching the world turn.". Hamid said "With this record, she maintains that quaky, sultry tone she's famous for, but in amongst all of this she takes more chances with her arrangements." Tom Hocknell from BBC said "Stone's second solo LP offers familiar sounds, and misses the contrast of her brother.".

Track listing

Charts

Weekly charts

Year-end charts

Release history

References

2012 albums
Julia Stone albums
EMI Records albums
Nettwerk Records albums
Albums produced by Pat Dillett